The blue nuthatch (Sitta azurea) is a bird species in the nuthatch family Sittidae. The species, which shows slight sexual dimorphism, has dramatic coloration unlike any other member of its genus. Its head is black or blackish-blue dark blue  close to purple with azure feathers. The wings are edged with black. The throat and chest are white or a washed buff color, contrasting with the upperparts and the belly of a very dark blue; the covert feathers are generally clear, blue-gray or purplish.

The blue nuthatch's ecology is poorly known, but it feeds on small invertebrates found on trees; reproduction takes place from April to June or July. It also forages in mixed-species flocks in larger groups. They can be found in the Malay Peninsula and on the islands of Sumatra and Java in Indonesia, where it inhabits subtropical or tropical moist lowland forest and subtropical or tropical moist montane forest above  in altitude. 

Three subspecies are recognized: S. a. expectata, S. a. nigriventer and S. a. azurea, which differ chiefly in the coloring of their , chests and bellies. The species' closest relatives are the velvet-fronted nuthatch (S. frontalis), the yellow-billed nuthatch (S. solangiae) and the sulphur-billed nuthatch (S. oenochlamys). The population of the species has not been determined but the species appears to be at low risk of extinction because of the extent of its distribution. It has been classified as of least concern by the International Union for Conservation of Nature.

Taxonomy 
The blue nuthatch was first described in 1830 under its current binomial name, Sitta azurea, by the French naturalist René Primevère Lesson (1794–1849). Sitta is derived from the Ancient Greek name for nuthatches, sittē. "Nuthatch", first recorded in 1350, is derived from "nut" and a word probably related to "hack", since these birds hack at nuts they have wedged into crevices. The genus may be further divided into seven subgenera, of which the blue nuthatch is placed alone in Poecilositta (Buturlin 1916).

The nuthatches constitute a genus, Sitta, of small passerine birds in the family Sittidae, typified by short, compressed wings and short, square 12-feathered tails, a compact body, longish pointed , strong toes with long claws, and behaviorally, by their unique head-first manner of descending tree trunks. Most nuthatches have gray or bluish upperparts and a black eyestripe. In 2006, ornithologist Edward C. Dickinson Proposed splitting Sitta in multiple genera on the basis of distinct morphological traits. He suggested as candidates the velvet-fronted nuthatch (Sitta frontalis) and the blue nuthatch, the morphology of which he describes as "rather aberrant ... in spite of a character trait (white edges to wing feathers) shared with Sitta formosa", and that doing so might, in turn, require the beautiful nuthatch (S. formosa) to be split off as well. He stated, however, that a molecular study would be warranted prior to any re-classification.

In 2014, Eric Pasquet and colleagues published a phylogeny based on examination of nuclear and mitochondrial DNA of 21 nuthatch species. The position of the blue nuthatch within the genus was not established with certainty, having a far lower correlation than many others in the model. Nevertheless, under the findings the species appears best represented by a clade comprising the velvet-fronted nuthatch and the sulphur-billed nuthatch (S. oenochlamys). These tropical Asian nuthatches are themselves a sister clade to one comprising the subgenus Sitta (Micrositta) (sometimes called the canadensis group), along with the brown-headed nuthatch (S. pusilla) and the pygmy nuthatch (S. pygmaea).

Subspecies 
There are three recognized subspecies of the blue nuthatch.

 S. a. expectata (Hartert, 1914), described in 1914 by German ornithologist Ernst Hartert as Callisitta azurea expectata from a holotype taken in the Malay Peninsula's Semangko Pass in Pahang; it is also found in Sumatra;
 S. a. nigriventer (Robinson & Kloss, 1919), described in 1919 by British zoologists Herbert Robinson and Cecil Kloss as Poliositta azurea nigriventer from a holotype taken at Mount Gede in West Java, Indonesia. British ornithologist William Swainson had described the subspecies under the name dendrophila flavipes in 1838, but the name was subsequently little used, and can be considered a nomen oblitum ("forgotten name");
 S. a. azurea (Lesson, 1830) the nominate subspecies, was described in 1830 by René Lesson from a specimen possibly taken on the Arjuno-Welirang stratovolcano; inhabits central and eastern Java.

Description 
Its appearance differs significantly from all other nuthatches. All of its subspecies are broadly black and white (especially when viewed in low-light conditions in which their dark blue coloring is not apparent) and have upper plumage shot through with dramatic notes of cobalt, azure and other lighter shades of blue, as well as grays and purples. The head is black, or blackish-blue with a broad, pale blue .

The three subspecies vary predominantly in the coloring of their mantles, chests and bellies. The upperparts are dark blue at the mantle or purplish in some subspecies. The rectrices, which are the tail's flight feathers, are pale blue in the middle with a black border and contrast sharply with the dark areas of the coat. The throat and breast are white, or washed buff, especially in S. a. nigriventer. The belly and abdomen are blackish, contrasting with blue-gray or purplish . The bill is lavender, slightly tinged with green, and black at the tip; the legs are a pale blue-gray and the claws are slate or black.

The species displays no significant sexual dimorphism, but Japanese ornithologist Nagamichi Kuroda describes the female as having slightly duller upperparts. Juveniles resemble adults, but have a duller crown and ear coverts, as well as a brown cast that does not cover their entire body. The belly is a dull black and the undertail coverts are variably edged creamy white. The juvenile's bill is blackish, with a pink base. Adults experience a partial moult before the breeding season (February–March for S. a. expectata; March–April for S. a. azurea) involving the throat, chest and mantle; a complete moult takes place after the breeding season (March–April and August in Java in Malaysia).

Vocalizations 

The species' vocalizations include a melodious tup or tip, a sudden whit, a thin hissing sit, and a fuller, harder, and more forceful chit. When excited, sit and chit notes are frequently given quickly and repetitively as a chi-chit, chit-chit-chit or chir-ri-rit, which can be prolonged, accelerated into staccato trilling tititititititik, or even becoming a rattling tr-r-r-r-r-r-t. Other calls include a thin, squeaking zhe and zhe-zhe, a squeaky toy-like nasal snieu or kneu, and a buzzy chirr-u. The vocal repertoire of the blue nuthatch is quite varied and is reminiscent of the velvet-fronted nuthatch and, to a lesser extent, the sulphur-billed nuthatch.

Behavior and ecology 

The blue nuthatch is very active, often seen running in pairs, in larger groups, or mingling in mixed-species foraging flocks.

Diet 
The blue nuthatch feeds on arthropods, of which some have been particularly identified as common in its diet, including Trachypholis beetles, click beetles, Eumolpinae leaf beetles, spiders, and moth caterpillars. It typically forages for prey in the upper half of large trees, and occasionally in smaller trees. While prospecting on tree trunks, the bird protects its corneas from falling bark and other debris by contracting the bare skin around its eyes – an adaptation apparently unique to the species.

Breeding 
The breeding of the species has not been extensively studied. The nest is made in a small tree hole in which it lays three to four dirty-white eggs, washed in lavender and densely speckled with reddish-brown and gray, that measure . In Peninsular Malaysia, juveniles just reaching maturity were observed in late June; on the island of Java, the breeding season takes place from April to July, and on Sumatra an adult feeding its young was observed on May 9.

Predation 
Little has been specifically reported on blue nuthatch predators, but one individual was seen to freeze during the passage of a prospecting black eagle (Ictinaetus malayensis).

Distribution and habitat 
This species lives in the Malay Peninsula (in extreme southern Thailand and northern Malaysia) and in Indonesia on the islands of Sumatra and Java. In Malaysia, the species has been observed in Bukit Larut, in the state of Perak, in the Titiwangsa Mountains, in southern Hulu Langat, in the state of Selangor, as well as some isolated populations on the slopes of the massive Mount Benom in the state of Pahang, on Mount Tahan located at the Pahang-Kelantan border, on Mount Rabong in Kelantan and at Mount Padang in the Sultanate of Terengganu.

In Sumatra, the bird is found throughout the Barisan Mountains, and has been observed in the Gayo Highlands of Aceh province, the Batak Highlands of northern Sumatra, and at Dempo in the south of the island. In a 1918 expedition by Robinson and Kloss, they commented: "from the commencement of heavy jungle on the valley slopes up to about 8,000 feet on Korinchi Peak this strikingly coloured little Nuthatch was very common, feeding on tall tree trunks in parties of six or seven."

The blue nuthatch is typically found on mountains, inhabiting subtropical or tropical moist lowland forest and subtropical or tropical moist montane forest. Ornithologist John MacKinnon has reported some rare sightings at lower altitudes on the plains of Java.

Threats and protection
The blue nuthatch is a common bird in Sumatra, including in the area of Kerinci Seblat National Park and relatively common in Malaysia and Java. It has a very wide distribution area, approaching . The population has not been rigorously estimated but is considered significant and at low risk, despite BirdLife International's observation that some decline is likely (but not as yet confirmed) due to known destruction and fragmentation of areas the species is known to inhabit. The blue nuthatch is placed in the category of least concern by the International Union for Conservation of Nature.

Footnotes

Citations

Bibliography 

 
 

blue nuthatch
Birds of the Malay Peninsula
Birds of Sumatra
Birds of Java
blue nuthatch
Taxa named by René Lesson
Articles containing video clips
Taxonomy articles created by Polbot